Ashish Chettri (born 22 December 1992 in Sikkim, India) is an Indian footballer who plays as a defender.

Career

United Sikkim
After spending time at Royal Wahingdoh, Chettri signed for newly promoted United Sikkim F.C. of the I-League. Chettri made his professional debut for United Sikkim against Pune F.C. on 20 September 2012 during the 2012 Indian Federation Cup at the Keenan Stadium in which United Sikkim lost 1–0.

International
Chettri played for India U16 during the qualification for the 2008 AFC U-16 Championship. He made his debut at the under-16 level during qualifying on 27 October 2007 against Sri Lanka U17 coming on as a 78th-minute substitute for Tanmoy Ghosh as India U16s won the match 6–0. He scored his first goal at U-16 level on 7 November 2007 against Bhutan in 34th minute as India U-16 went on to win that match and qualify for the final rounds of the 2008 AFC U-16 Championship.

Career statistics

Club
Statistics accurate as of 12 May 2013

References

Indian footballers
1992 births
Living people
Footballers from Sikkim
Indian Gorkhas
I-League players
United Sikkim F.C. players
Association football defenders